IBM 7070 was a decimal-architecture intermediate data-processing system that was introduced by IBM in 1958. It was part of the IBM 700/7000 series, and was based on discrete transistors rather than the vacuum tubes of the 1950s. It was the company's first transistorized stored-program computer.

The 7070 was expected to be a "common successor to at least the 650 and the 705". The 7070 was not designed to be instruction set compatible with the 650, as the latter had a second jump address in every instruction to allow optimal use of the drum, something unnecessary and wasteful in a computer with random-access core memory. As a result, a simulator was needed to run old programs. The 7070 was also marketed as an IBM 705 upgrade, but failed miserably due to its incompatibilities, including an inability to fully represent the 705 character set; forcing IBM to quickly introduce the IBM 7080 as a "transistorized IBM 705" that was fully compatible.

The 7070 series stored data in words containing 10 decimal digits plus a sign. Digits were encoded using a two-out-of-five code. Characters were represented by a two-digit code. The machine shipped with 5,000 to 9,990 words of core memory and the CPU speed was about 27KIPS. A typical system was leased for $17,400 per month or could be purchased for $813,000.

Later systems in this series were the faster IBM 7074 introduced in July 1960
and the IBM 7072 (1961). They were eventually replaced by the System/360, announced in 1964.

Hardware implementation

The 7070 was implemented using both CTDL (in the logic and control sections) and current-mode logic (in the timing storage and core storage sections) on Standard Modular System (SMS) cards. A total of about 30,000 alloy-junction germanium transistors and 22,000 germanium diodes are used, on approximately 14,000 SMS cards.

Additional or optional I/O units

Disk storage
The IBM 7300 Disk Storage Unit had a capacity of 6 million digits.

From 1961: the IBM 1301-1 Disk Storage Unit which had a capacity of 28 million characters.

IBM 1414 I/O
 IBM 1414-6 Input-Output Synchronizer contains 6 buffers and can attach a variety of serial I/O devices:
 1009 Data Transmission Unit (modem)
 1011 Paper Tape Reader
 1014 Remote Enquiry Units (keyboards and typewriter)
 Telegraph I/O units

The 1414-6 is connected to 7070/7074 via the IBM 7907 Data Channel Switch. The 7907 can execute channel programs from the main memory of the 7070.

See also 
 IBM 608, IBMs first all-transistor product (only plugboard-programmable)

References

External links 
The IBM 7070 Experiences of one user, Tom Van Vleck
BIRTH OF AN UNWANTED IBM COMPUTER Computer History Vignettes by Bob Bemer
IBM 7070 documentation on Bitsavers.org
Dave Pitts' IBM 7090 support – Includes a cross assembler for the IBM 7070/7074
  Contains about 10 pages of IBM 7070 survey detail: applications, customers, specifications, and costs.
Cover of IBM 7070 brochure at Classic Computer Brochures

7070
7 7070
Computer-related introductions in 1959
Decimal computers